Manus "Mandy" Kelly (9 February 1978 – 23 June 2019) was an Irish rally driver, businessman, and local politician. As a rally driver, he participated in the Irish Tarmac Rally Championship and won the Donegal International Rally on three consecutive occasions, in 2016, 2017, and 2018. As a businessman, he ran a Letterkenny-based facilities management company and a local café, employing dozens of people in the community. As a Fianna Fáil politician, he ran in the local elections of 24 May 2019 and won a seat on Donegal County Council.

Kelly was killed in a crash on 23 June 2019 while competing in the 2019 Donegal International Rally. After his death, numerous public figures, including Taoiseach Leo Varadkar, paid tribute to his achievements.

Background and personal life
Kelly was a native of Glenswilly in County Donegal. Son of Donal and Jacqueline, he came from a family of nine. He had four brothers, Donal, Caolan, Teigharan and Leon, and four sisters, Breigeen, Kelda, Ciara and Shannagh. He was educated at Glenswilly National School and St Eunan's College.

Letterkenny General Hospital employed Kelly as a porter, and he later drove the "cancer bus" which took seriously ill patients from Donegal to Dublin for cancer treatment. Kelly was a road-safety advocate in local schools, and was also a volunteer with Donegal Down Syndrome.

With his wife Bernie, he had three sons, Mandy, Conan, and Charlie, and two daughters, Annie and Bella. Their ages, at the time of his death, ranged from one to 21.

Sport
A driver in the Irish Tarmac Rally Championship, he won the Donegal International Rally on three consecutive occasions, in 2016, 2017, and 2018.

Kelly was involved in coaching Gaelic football and led his local team Glenswilly to a Senior C Championship win in 2016.

Business
Kelly was proprietor of Uptown Café in Letterkenny. He also founded and served as managing director of Tailored Facility Solutions, a company employing dozens of people.

Politics
In the 2019 Donegal County Council election, Kelly stood as a Fianna Fáil candidate in the Letterkenny electoral area. He launched his campaign on 29 March 2019, and was endorsed by outgoing Fianna Fáil councillor and fellow sportsman James Pat McDaid. He carried on with his racing career during his election campaign. He received 906 first-preference votes and was elected to Donegal County Council on the 9th count.

Death and funeral
On 23 June 2019 at around 12:30 IST, Kelly crashed on the Fanad Head loop while competing in the 2019 Donegal International Rally. His Hyundai i20 R5 car went through a hedge and into a field, and was damaged extensively. The Gardaí subsequently confirmed his death. His injured co-driver Donall Barrett was hospitalized and the remaining stages of the 2019 rally were cancelled. He was survived by his wife, five children, his parents, and his eight siblings.

Local and national politicians paid tribute, including Taoiseach Leo Varadkar, who called him a "phenomenal motorsportsman"; Fianna Fáil leader Micheál Martin, who described his death as "an immeasurable loss to us all"; and Minister of State for Tourism and Sport Brendan Griffin, who called him "a great ambassador for Irish motor sport". Motorsport Ireland and the Donegal Motor Club also paid tribute to him and expressed sympathy to his family and friends. Kelly's death came on the same day that Donegal won their tenth Ulster Senior Football Championship, captained by his clubmate and close friend Michael Murphy, who missed the team homecoming after hearing what had happened.

Around 700 mourners attended Kelly's funeral at St Columba's Church, Glenswilly on 27 June 2019. The funeral cortège was led by the Subaru Impreza S12B WRC in which he had won the Donegal International Rally three times, driven by rally champion Declan Boyle, and with Kelly's son Charlie in the passenger seat. Micheál Martin attended the funeral, as did Minister for Education and Skills Joe McHugh, while the Taoiseach was represented by his aide-de-camp. Following the funeral mass, his four brothers carried his coffin across the Donegal International Rally ramp. He was laid to rest in Conwal Cemetery.

References

1978 births
2019 deaths
Fianna Fáil politicians
Irish businesspeople
Irish rally drivers
Irish sportsperson-politicians
Local councillors in County Donegal
People educated at St Eunan's College
Sportspeople from County Donegal